Alzheimer may refer to:

 Alzheimer's disease, the most common form of dementia
 Early-onset Alzheimer's disease, the common dementia diagnosed before the age of 65
 Alois Alzheimer, the neuropathologist and psychiatrist who characterized Alzheimer's disease
 Alzheimer's (film), a 2010 Egyptian film
 Alzheimer (film), a 2011 Iranian film

See also
 Alzheimer's Association (US)
 Alzheimer's Society (UK)
 Alzheimer's Research Trust (UK)